Ri Jin-hwa (born September 24, 1988) is a North Korean female acrobatic gymnast. With partners Ri Hyang and Kim Un-sol, Ri achieved 4th in the 2014 Acrobatic Gymnastics World Championships.

References

External links

 

1988 births
Living people
North Korean acrobatic gymnasts
Female acrobatic gymnasts